Tomasi Namua Sauqaqa is a former Fijian politician, who served in the Cabinet as Assistant Minister for Health from 2001 to 2006.  In this capacity, he assisted the Minister for Health, Solomone Naivalu.

In the election held in September 2001, he won the Ba West Fijian Communal Constituency for Interim Prime Minister Laisenia Qarase's party, the Soqosoqo Duavata ni Lewenivanua (SDL), and was subsequently appointed Minister for Tourism.

The Fiji Village news service announced on 21 March 2006 that the SDL had decided not to nominate Sauqaqa for another Parliamentary term.  He therefore retired at the general election held on 6–13 May, and was succeeded by Ratu Meli Saukuru.

References

I-Taukei Fijian members of the House of Representatives (Fiji)
Living people
Soqosoqo Duavata ni Lewenivanua politicians
Government ministers of Fiji
Politicians from Ba Province
Year of birth missing (living people)